Miss Grand Italy or Miss Grand International Italy is a national female beauty pageant in Italy, held annually since 2019, aiming to select the country representative for Miss Grand International, which is an annual international beauty pageant promoting World Peace and against all kinds of conflicts. The pageant has been being managed by a Benevento-based event organizer MUPI SRL., chaired by Giuseppe Puzio, since its establishment.

Since the establishment of Miss Grand International, to date, Italy representatives have never won the contest. The current titleholder is Marika Nardoz of Lazio, who was crowned on 26 September 2021 at Cinecittà World in Rome, outclassing other 39 finalists.

Background

History
Before the franchise acquiring of the current Italian national director Giuseppe Puzio in 2019, Italy has ever sent its representatives to compete at the Miss Grand international three times, including Katarina Chabrecekova in 2013, Maria Grazia Murazzani in 2015, and Martina Corrias in 2016. However, all mentioned representatives have been appointed to the position by different licensees. The inaugural edition of Miss Grand Italy was held under the leadership of Puzio in Benevento on 10 September and was broadcast nationwide via the Italian Satellite television channel, Sky Italia N.180, in which Mirea Sorrentino from Pompeii was announced the winner, outclassing 39 other finalists, and the contest has been held annually since then.

The national organizer has been franchising the regional competitions to individual agencies since their first edition in 2019, twelve regions held their regional pageants to select the national finalists for the first national edition, including Sicilia, Calabria, Basilicata, Campania, Molise, Lazio, Umbria, Marche, Trentino-Alto Adige, Veneto, Lombardia, and Sardegna. In 2020, due to the COVID-19 pandemic, the national participants was dropped to 24.

Edition
The following list is the edition detail of the Miss Grand Italy contest, since its inception in 2019.

Contestant selection

Titleholders
Colors key

 Declared as the winner
 Ended as a runner-up (Top 5)
 Ended as a finalist (Top 10)

 Ended as a semifinalist (Top 20/21)
 Unplaced
 Did not compete

Gallery

References

External links

 

Italy
Recurring events established in 2019
Beauty pageants in Italy